Hans Martin Otto Lennings (6 December 1904 – 19 September 1962) was a German member of the Sturmabteilung, the original paramilitary wing of the Nazi Party. Lennings gained posthumous notoriety in 2019 after the discovery of a 1955 affidavit, in which he admitted participating in the burning of the Reichstag building in Berlin on February 27, 1933.

Lennings' tribunal files have been preserved in the Staatsarchiv Ludwigsburg under the designations "EL 902/20 Bü 18246" and "EL 902/15 Bü 13880". The 1955 affidavit from the Hanover district court was handed over to the Hanover department of Niedersächsisches Landesarchiv in November 2019 and are preserved there under the designation "NLA HA Nds. 725 Hanover Acc. 2019/125 No. 1".

References 

Nazi Germany
Sturmabteilung officers
Sturmabteilung personnel